Telewizja Polsat is a Polish media company and broadcaster of television channels mainly under the Polsat brand.

In November 2010 Cyfrowy Polsat announced that it is buying 100% of the Telewizja Polsat shares.

Channels

Entertainment
Polsat HD
 Polsat 1 (HD)
 Polsat 2 (HD)
 TV4 (HD) 
 Super Polsat (HD)
 TV6 (HD)
 Polsat Comedy Central Extra (HD)
 Polsat Seriale (HD)
 Polsat X
 Polsat Rodzina (HD)

News
 Polsat News (HD)
 Polsat News 2 (HD)
 Wydarzenia 24 (HD)

Sports
 Eleven Sports (half stake) (HD)
 Polsat Sport (HD)
 Polsat Games (HD)
 Polsat Sport Premium PPV (HD)
 Polsat Sport Extra (HD)
 Polsat Sport News (HD)
 Polsat Sport Fight (HD)
 Polsat Sport Premium 1 (Super HD)
 Polsat Sport Premium 2 (Super HD)

Movies
 Polsat Film (HD)
 Polsat Film 2

Lifestyle
 Polsat Café (HD)
 Polsat Play (HD)
 Nowa TV (HD)
 Polsat Reality

Kids
 Polsat JimJam

Documentaries
 Polsat Doku (HD)
 Fokus TV (HD)
 Polsat Viasat Nature (HD)
 Polsat Viasat History (HD)
 Polsat Viasat Explore (HD)
 Crime+Investigation Polsat (HD)

Music
 Polsat Music (HD)
  Disco Polo Music
 Eska TV  (HD)
 Eska TV Extra (HD)
 Eska Rock TV
 Polo TV (HD)
 Vox Music TV

Infomercial
 TV Okazje (HD)

Radio

Muzo FM

Former Channels

Nasza TV

TVR Bryza

TV Vigor

Dla Ciebie 

ONA

Formuła 1

ON

Smyk

Junior

Komedia

Polsat 2 Info

Polsat 2 International

INFO Dokument

INFO

Polsat Zdrowie i Uroda

Play TV

POLSAT FUTBOL

TV Biznes

POLSAT BIZNES 

Polsat VOLLEYBALL (HD)

Radio PIN

Polsat Sport 2 (HD)

Polsat Sport 3 (HD)

Muzo TV

8TV (HD)

Hip Hop TV

Polsat Food Network (HD)

Tenis Premium 1 (HD)

Tenis Premium 2 (HD)

ATM Rozrywka 

Superstacja

Cyfrowy Polsat
The Polsat group operates Cyfrowy Polsat one of the main providers of digital multichannel television in Poland. It is the fourth largest digital platform in Europe and the largest in Central and Eastern Europe. The service is distributed over the Hot Bird satellite and includes a mix of free to air and encrypted channels requiring a subscription for minimum 50 złoty.

References

External links
 
Cyfrowy Polsat channel list
List of Polsat's programs

Polsat
Mass media in Poland
Mass media in Warsaw
Television networks in Poland
Mass media companies of Poland
Mass media companies established in 1992
Polish companies established in 1992
Polish Limited Liability Companies